Mogaung or Möngkawng was a Shan state in what is present-day Myanmar. It was an outlying territory, located away from the main Shan State area in present-day Kachin State. The state existed until 1796. The main town was Mogaung (Mong Kawng).

History 

According to legend a predecessor state named Udiri Pale had been established in 58 BC. The area was said to have been inhabited by the Tai Long. According to Tai chronicles the kingdom was founded in 1215 by a saopha named Sam Long Hpa who ruled over an area stretching from Hkamti Long to Shwebo, and extending into the country of the Nagas and Mishmis.

Möngkawng (Mong Yang) was occupied by China between 1479 and 1483, after regaining independence it was again briefly occupied by China in 1495.
From 1651 to 1742 the state was occupied by the Ava-based Kingdom of Burma and following a period of less than thirty years it was again occupied by Burma from 1771 to 1775. Finally Möngkawng was annexed by the Ava Kingdom in 1796.

After becoming part of Burma Möngkawng was ruled by administrators named wuns. During British rule in Burma it became part of the Myitkyina District of the Mandalay Division.

In Chinese chronicle Ming Shilu, the state was known as Mengyang and was under Yunnan as a pacification superintendency. In the same chronicle, the kingdom is said to extend to the east to Jinsha River in China, south to Ava-Burma, west to the territory of Da-Gula and to the north till Ganyai, a polity near Daying river. 

In 1408, the polity was occupied by Da-Gula. 

It is asserted that it was originally under the territory of Lu-chuan and it is to Mongkawng and Da-Gula where Si Jifa, the ruler of Mong Mao fled after the destruction of Lu-chuan by the Chinese during the Luchuan–Pingmian campaigns (1436–49).

Rulers
The rulers of the state bore the title Saopha.

Saophas
 603–633 Hkun Su (Youngest son of Hkun Lu) 1st-Möngkawng 
 633–653 Sao Hsen Saw (Son of Hkun Lu)
 653–667 Sao Hkun Kyaw 
 667–668 Sao Hkun Kyun
 938–9?? Sao Hkaw Hpa (2nd-Möngkawng)
 ---- – ---- Sao Haw Hseng 
 ---- – ---- Hso Saw Hpa 
 1150–1201 Sao Sam Lung Hpa Hkun Mong (3rd-Möngkawng)
 1432/1433–1445 Sao Ngan Hpa
 1445–1449 Sao Hpi Hpa 
 1449–1495 Hso Pope Hpa
 1495–1532 Kywansisa (Sao Sai Lung or Mogaung Mintayagyi)  
 1532–1557 Sao Lab Hpa (brother of Sao Sai Lung)
 1557–1567 Sao Hed Perng (son of Sao Sai Lung) 
 1567–1580 Hsawng Hkam Long Sunt (son of Sao Hed Perng)
 1580–1591 Pan Hlaing Hpa (son of Sao Lab Hpa) He rebellious and took to Bago by Mingyi Hnaung in March 1591 
 1591–1592 Pan Hlaing Lung (son of Pan Hlaing Hpa) He was hiding outside the city and confiscated the city after his father Pan Hlaing Hpa took to Bago after that he defeated the Minye Kyawswa in mid 1592 and took to Bago 
 1592–1600 Sao Ngoek Hpa (come from Mongsit) or Mongsitsa 
 1600–1629 Hso Vieng Hpa 

 1629–1645 Hso Hom Hpa 
 1645–1658 Hso Thet Hpa 
 1658–1663 Hso Tamma 
 1663–1673: Sui Yaw
1673–1729: Sui Kyek
1729–1739: Hum
1739–1748: Haw  (1st time) (d. 1777)
1748–1765: Haw Kam
1765–1768: Haw  (2nd time) (s.a.)
1768–1771: Maung Kiaw
1771–1775: Maung Piu (d. 1775)
1775–1785: Vacant
1785–1796: Yaw Pan Kyung

References

Bibliography

External links
"Gazetteer of Upper Burma and the Shan states"

Shan States
Kachin State

ca:Mongkawng